FM4 is an Austrian national radio station.

FM4 may also refer to:
 Farm to Market Road 4, in Texas
 Front Mission 4, a video game